La Grande Soufrière, or simply Soufrière, is an active stratovolcano on the French island of Basse-Terre, Guadeloupe. It is the highest mountain peak in the Lesser Antilles, rising 1,467 m high.

The last magmatic eruption was in 1580±50 during which the current lava dome was emplaced. More recent eruptions have been phreatic in type. On February 8, 1843, an eruption of La Grande Soufrière caused by an earthquake killed over 5,000 people.

Significant seismic activity in 1976 led to a mass evacuation of the island's 72,000 residents. There was a bitter, and well-publicized, controversy between scientists Claude Allègre and Haroun Tazieff on whether evacuation should occur. Allègre held that inhabitants should be evacuated, just in case, while Tazieff held that the Soufrière was harmless. The prefect decided to evacuate, erring on the side of covering his back. The volcano erupted on August 30, 1976, but much less severely than predicted by the Allègre side. There were no fatalities and no significant damage, except for the large cost of the evacuation.

While the island was deserted, the German filmmaker Werner Herzog traveled to the abandoned town of Basse-Terre to find a peasant who had refused to leave his home on the slopes of the volcano. His journey is recorded in the film La Soufrière.

Gallery

See also 
 Lists of volcanoes
 Guadeloupe National Park

References 

 
 OVSG : Observatoire volcanologique et sismologique de Guadeloupe
 Parc National de la Guadeloupe, manager of the top of the Soufrière

Mountains of Guadeloupe
Volcanoes of Guadeloupe
Stratovolcanoes of France
Active volcanoes
Natural history of Guadeloupe
Mountains of the Caribbean
Highest points of French national parks